Tom Souville (24 February 1777, Calais – 31 December 1839, Calais), was a privateer and "rescue of Calais", causing the first "rescue boat" from Calais, lateen-rigged in 1819 with the support of society to Agriculture Calais. He was Freemason.

History
Thomas Souville, the English called him Cap'n Tom, was the son of a doctor. Yet nothing predestined to be privateer, it was to the spirit of adventure and risk appetite, he made this choice. Tom was educated at Dover, then he goes to sea as a ship's boy, he's only 11 years. Captivated by the sea, he will choose to serve on warships. Many envy his experience, and yet he's only 18. Several naval battles under his belt, three wounds, exchanged prisoner. Promoted ensign, Tom asks a letter of marque, we not given. His youth will be for many. It will therefore serve another master until the age of majority. Reached his majority, Thomas will prove incredibly effective.

Letter of Marque
Tom Souville is one of the most illustrious of the race system, the financial stakes for the time. Between 1811 and 1815, it reported more than 5 million francs to city of Calais, and from 1793, active from the ports of the Channel and North Sea. Tom Souville as a privateer in the city of Calais, sported on his ship, "the flag of Calais". Indeed, Calais was one of five cities in France to be allowed to have its own flag, by "Royal Order", with Dunkirk, Boulogne-sur-Mer, Le Havre and St Malo. Calais is the flag which floated so «Le Vieux Beffroi», at the head of town bands and of course, the mast of the privateers of the city.

See also
Letter of marque
Privateer

Bibliography
 Henri Chevalier, Vie et Aventures du Capitaine de Corsaire Tom Souville : ses combats, ses évasions, 1777-1839, Paris, Éditions Plon, Nourrit et Cie, 1895
 Henri Lemoine, Les Corsaires Calaisiens, Mémoires de la Société Historique du Calaisis

References

External links
  List of privateer
  List of Ship privateer

People from Calais
1777 births
1839 deaths
French privateers